Subway Surfers is an endless runner mobile game which is co-developed by Kiloo and SYBO Games, private companies based in Denmark. It is available on Android, iOS, HarmonyOS, Kindle, and Windows Phone platforms and uses the Unity game engine. In the game, players take the role of young graffiti artists who, upon being caught in the act of "tagging" a metro railway site, run through the railroad tracks to escape from the inspector and his dog. As they run, they grab gold coins, power-ups, and many other items along the way while simultaneously dodging collisions with trains and other objects. They can also jump on top of the trains and surf with hoverboards to evade capture until the character crashes into an obstacle, gets caught by the inspector, or gets hit by a train, at which point the game ends. Special events, such as the Season Hunt and other, can result in in-game rewards and characters.

Gameplay

Subway Surfers is an endless runner video game. The game starts by tapping the touchscreen, while Jake (the game's starter character) or any other character sprays graffiti on a subway, and gets caught in the act by the inspector and his dog, who starts chasing the character. While running, the player can swipe up, down, left, or right to avoid crashing into oncoming obstacles especially moving subways, poles, tunnel walls and barriers. By swiping rapidly as speed increases, more points can be acquired. A crash results in a game over, but the player can continue running by using keys, or watching an ad. The player can collect various items such as coins, keys, score multipliers, super sneakers, jetpacks, magnets, mystery boxes and power jumpers. A power jumper provides combustion by launching up the character, a jetpack gives the ability to fly, a coin magnet attracts coins on the track, super sneakers give the ability to jump higher, and a score multiplier multiplies the rate at which the score counts. Items, such as a hoverboard (which could be used by double tapping on screen), allow the character to avoid collisions and last about 30 seconds.

Daily Challenges and Season Hunts give rewards for unique movements throughout gameplay. In daily challenges, the player needs to collect letters that constitute a word related to the game, such as "score" and "jump"; also known as "word hunt". Missions have various tasks measured by player accuracy. Up to 18 characters can be unlocked using coins, keys, in-game purchases, collecting specific items, or connecting to a Facebook account. Most characters have up to 2 different outfits. Meanwhile, up to 17 hoverboards can be unlocked with the same methods. Each have different abilities that can assist the player. When the game updates to a new location, a new character and hoverboard will be available temporarily until the next update.

Releases and downloads
Subway Surfers was released on 24 May 2012 with updates based on seasonal holidays. Since January 2013, updates have been based on a "World Tour" theme, which updates the setting of the game every three (or four, usually for seasonal holidays) weeks.

In March 2018, Subway Surfers became the first game on the Google Play Store to cross the one billion downloads threshold. In May 2018, Subway Surfers crossed the two billion download mark. App Annie reported Subway Surfers as the #2 downloaded game of all time in iOS App Store.

In December 2019, SYBO Games announced that Subway Surfers, according to AppAnnie statistics, crossed the 2.7 billion download mark. Subway Surfers was the most downloaded mobile game of the decade from 2012 to 2019.

Reception

Subway Surfers received mixed to positive reviews. Critics praised the game's visual style and entertaining gameplay, but criticized it for its monotonous world and unresponsive controls. Review aggregator website Metacritic gave the game 71 out of 100 based on 8 reviews.

Dan Griliopoulos of Pocket Gamer gave the game a score of 5 out of 10, praising the game's fun gameplay and free access, but criticizing the game's controls and parsimonious game design.

Gamezebo's Dant Rambo scored the game 3.5 out of 5, writing "It makes little attempt to stand out from other endless runners, but it's hard not to appreciate the polish of Subway Surfers. The controls are responsive, the gameplay is addictive, and it doesn't try and force you into spending cash on in-game items."

Other reviewers were not as critical. 148Apps and TouchArcade gave the game 4/5.

The game was nominated for "Action Game" and "Family & Kids Game" at the 2019 Webby Awards. It was the most downloaded mobile game of the decade.

Subway Surfers: The Animated Series
On 1 June 2018, a series of animated shorts debuted on SYBO Games' YouTube channel. The 10 x 4-minute episodic series is scripted by Brent Friedman and Francesca Marie Smith, and produced by Sander Schwartz. Chris Bartleman is the supervising director and Michael Hegner is the director. Denmark's William provides post-production services. The series has 11 episodes.

References

2012 video games
3D platform games
Android (operating system) games
Video games developed in Denmark
Windows Phone games
Endless runner games
Single-player video games
IOS games
MacOS games
Works about underground railways